Hasim Sharif Rahman Jr. (born June 15, 1991) is an American professional boxer who challenged for the WBC-USNBC heavyweight title in April 2022. He is the son of former heavyweight world champion of boxing, Hasim Rahman.

Early life 
Hasim Sharif Rahman Jr. was born on June 15, 1991 in Baltimore, Maryland. He is the son of former professional boxer and two-time world heavyweight champion Hasim Rahman.

Professional career 
After over 100 amateur fights, Rahman Jr. made his professional boxing debut on April 14, 2017.
He started his career with three wins via TKO. In 2021 Rahman Jr.  fought three times, with two fights ending via some knockout. His last fight in April 2022, was a TKO loss at the hands of Kenzie Morrison, the son of former professional boxer, Tommy Morrison, for the WBC USNBC heavyweight title. 

Rahman Jr. was set to face Jake Paul on August 6, 2022 at Madison Square Garden as a late replacement, after British boxer and Love Island star Tommy Fury pulled out of the fight on July 6, 2022, citing difficulties in entering the USA after his ESTA was denied by US Homeland Security.  There are significant disparities in both size and experience between Rahman Jr and Paul, with the former having had over 100 amateur boxing bouts, while Paul has only had one, on the undercard of KSI vs Logan Paul in August, 2018. The difference in size between both men is also notable. Rahman weighed in at 224lb in his previous fight against Kenzie Morrision in April, 2022, while Paul only weighed in at 191lb for his rematch over Tyron Woodley in December, 2021. Paul's trainer and retired professional boxer BJ Flores also revealed that the New York State athletic commission advised against the fight, saying Rahman Jr is "too experienced" and "used to fighting bigger guys".

On July 30, 2022, Paul's promotional company, Most Valuable Promotions (MVP), revealed that Rahman had pulled out of the fight, and that the entire card was now cancelled. Rahman allegedly pulled out because of weight issues, with the New York State athletic commission unwilling to sanction the fight at the 200lb crusierweight because Rahman's weight-cut was progressing very slowly, having only lost 1lb since signing the contract. Paul, MVP, and the State commission then agreed to move forward with a new 205lb weight limit, with Rahman initially agreeing to this. However, Rahman then stated that he would not fight unless the fight was sanctioned at 215lb, resulting in MVP terminating his contract and the entire card being scrapped.

On August 27, 2022, DAZN announced that Rahman Jr. would be boxing former UFC Light Heavyweight Champion Vitor Belfort in the main event of MF & DAZN: X Series 002 on October 15, 2022, in Sheffield, England. The bout was postponed to MF & DAZN: X Series 003 on November 19, 2022, and took place at the Moody Center in Austin, Texas. Belfort withdrew from the fight after testing positive for COVID-19. Rahman Jr. then faced former NFL player and UFC fighter Greg Hardy in the co-main event and lost via unanimous decision. 

On September 14, 2022 it was announced that Rahman Jr. had signed to Happy Punch Promotions, a boxing promotion organization founded by YouTubers Keemstar and Fousey.

Personal life 
Rahman Jr. resides in Las Vegas, Nevada. He has twelve siblings, including Sharif Rahman who is also a boxer. Rahman Jr. is a practicing  Muslim and has frequently refused gambling and bets due to his beliefs.

In 2013, Rahman Jr. was involved in a car accident that resulted in the death of a driver. He was sentenced to three years in prison for reckless driving. He was released on December 21, 2016.

In 2014, Rahman Jr. and his brother filed a lawsuit alleging 14 different claims against Floyd Mayweather Jr. which came after an incident that involved Rahman Jr.'s brother getting a serious beating from amateur Donovan Cameron while Mayweather watched what was supposed to be a sparring session and prevented the people present from breaking up the fight.

Professional boxing record

References

External links

1991 births
Date of birth missing (living people)
Living people
American male boxers
Heavyweight boxers
Boxers from Maryland